Streetsmartz is an Australian television series. It is centred on the lives of a group of children, their friends and family who live in Fremantle, Western Australia. Three series, with a total of 39 episodes, were screened in 2005 and 2006 on the Nine Network.

Cast
 David Richardson as Vincenzo (Vinnie) Martino
 Fernando Colella as Joey Dunlop
 Lucy Cooke as Philippa (Pip) Holmes
 Anthony Harwood as Rick Martino
 Pia Prendiville as Hellie Connors
 Joel Turner as Stavros Papadopoulos
 Chelsea Jones as Giuseppina (Jess) Martino
 Valentina Barron as Samantha (Sammi) Martino
 Iain Gately as George Brady
 Rebecca McCarthy as Maxine (Max) Malesovic
Also:
 Cle Wootton as Sari the snake charmer
 John Bannister as Tom the muso 
 Heath Bergerson as Luke the didgeridoo player
 Gavan Ellis as Bruce Hopkins 
 Luciano Vecchio as Carlo Martino 
 Robbie Vecchio as Franco Martino 
 Monica Main as Aunt Rosa
 Kerry-Ella McAullay as Aunt Sophia
 Jay Walsh as Papa Graziano 
 Yeung-Ming Tan as Van 
 Anthony Spanos as Hector Papadopoulos
 Ben Garside as Radovan (Rad) Malesovic

See also
 List of Australian television series

References

External links
 
 Australian Television Information Archive

Australian children's television series
Nine Network original programming
Television shows set in Western Australia
2005 Australian television series debuts
2006 Australian television series endings
Television series about children